Sage Ja! (German for "Say Yes!") is the first maxi-CD release by the Neue Deutsche Härte band Unheilig.  Not only is it Unheilig's first maxi-CD release, it is also their first release of any media type. It was released on September 4, 2000.

Track listing

2000 singles
Unheilig songs
2000 songs